Saint Peter is an unincorporated community in Highland Township, Franklin County, Indiana.

History
Saint Peter was laid out in 1853. The community was originally built up chiefly by Germans, who established a large Catholic church there. A post office was established at Saint Peter in 1849, and remained in operation until 1906.

Geography

References

Unincorporated communities in Franklin County, Indiana
Unincorporated communities in Indiana